Brice Panel (born 13 June 1983 in Neuilly-sur-Seine) is a French sprinter, who specialized in the 400 metres. He set his personal best time of 45.54 seconds by finishing second at the Resisprint meeting in La Chaux-de-Fonds.

Panel competed for the men's 4 × 400 m relay at the 2008 Summer Olympics in Beijing, along with his teammates Teddy Venel, Richard Maunier, and Ydrissa M'Barke. He ran on the starting leg of the first heat, with an individual-split time of 45.59 seconds. Panel and his team finished the relay in eighth place for a total time of 3:03.19, failing to advance into the final.

Panel is a member of Saint-Quentin Centre Yvelines Track and Field Club, and is coached and trained by Djamel Boudhebiba.

References

External links

Profile – French Olympic Committee 
NBC 2008 Olympics profile

French male sprinters
Living people
Olympic athletes of France
Athletes (track and field) at the 2008 Summer Olympics
Sportspeople from Neuilly-sur-Seine
1983 births
20th-century French people
21st-century French people